Poplar Bluff Commercial Historic District is a national historic district located at Poplar Bluff, Butler County, Missouri.  It encompasses 14 contributing commercial buildings in the central business district of Poplar Bluff.  The district developed between about 1880 and 1930s, and includes representative examples of Italianate and Colonial Revival style architecture.  Notable buildings include the Fraternal Building (1928) and Begley Building (1908).

It was added to the National Register of Historic Places in 1994.

References

Historic districts on the National Register of Historic Places in Missouri
Commercial buildings on the National Register of Historic Places in Missouri
Italianate architecture in Missouri
Colonial Revival architecture in Missouri
Buildings and structures in Butler County, Missouri
National Register of Historic Places in Butler County, Missouri
1994 establishments in Missouri